The Astley Green Colliery Museum is a museum run by the Red Rose Steam Society in Astley near Tyldesley in Greater Manchester, England.  Before becoming a museum, the site was a working colliery that produced coal from 1912 to 1970; it is now protected as a Scheduled Monument. The museum occupies a  site by the Bridgewater Canal which has the only surviving pit headgear and engine house on the Lancashire Coalfield.

History
Astley Green Colliery exploited deep coal seams of the Manchester Coalfield underneath the peat bog known as Chat Moss, and was driven by the high demand for coal during the late 19th and early 20th centuries and the exhaustion of supplies of coal in the Irwell Valley. Shaft sinking began in 1908 by the Pilkington Colliery Company, a subsidiary of the Clifton and Kersley Coal Company, and the pit began production in 1912. In 1928 the colliery was amalgamated with other local collieries to form Manchester Collieries. The mine was modernised when the coal industry was nationalised in 1947. Astley Green Colliery was closed in 1970 and was subsequently opened to the public as a museum.

Museum

Astley Green Colliery has the only surviving headgear and engine house on what was the Lancashire coalfield. The  headgear is made from wrought iron lattice girders with rivetted plates at the joints. It has two large and one small wheel mounted at the top.
In the winding house there is a twin tandem compound steam engine made by Yates and Thom of Blackburn who supplied 16 Lancashire boilers. Its engine house has the largest steam winding engine used on the coalfield. The 3,300 horse power twin tandem compound engine was built by Yates & Thom in Blackburn.

The museum also has a collection of 28 colliery locomotives, the largest such collection in the UK.

Railway
As of Summer 2019, a roughly 200m section of track has been restored and built by volunteers. One locomotive is currently operational with another due to under essential maintenance, before passenger services can start on the railway.

See also
List of Collieries in Astley and Tyldesley
Scheduled Monuments in Greater Manchester
Listed buildings in Astley, Greater Manchester

References

External links
Astley Green Colliery Museum website
 History of Astley Green Coal Mine

Mining in Lancashire
Railway museums in England
Museums in Greater Manchester
Mining museums in England
Scheduled monuments in Greater Manchester
Tourist attractions in the Metropolitan Borough of Wigan
Coal mines in Lancashire
Underground mines in England